The Mechanische Baumwollspinnerei und Weberei is a cotton mill in Augsburg, Bavaria, Germany. It was founded in 1837 and was considered one of the oldest textile manufacturing companies in Germany. It was closed in 1989.

External links
 

Buildings and structures in Augsburg
Cotton mills
Textile mills in Germany